Gorgyra johnstoni, Johnston's ranger or Johnston's skipper, is a butterfly in the family Hesperiidae. It is found along the coast of Kenya and in Tanzania, the Democratic Republic of the Congo (Shaba), Malawi, Zambia, Mozambique and eastern Zimbabwe. The habitat consists of forests, riverine forests, forest margins, Brachystegia woodland and woodland.

Adults are attracted to flowers. They are on wing year-round.

References

Butterflies described in 1894
Erionotini
Butterflies of Africa